The Walnut Hill District is a historic district encompassing a predominantly residential area southwest of downtown New Britain, Connecticut.  Roughly bounded by Walnut Hill Park and the New Britain General Hospital, as well as West Main, Main, Arch, and Hart Streets, the area mirrors in residential architecture the growth of the city as an industrial center between 1840 and 1930.  The district was listed on the National Register of Historic Places in 1975.

Description and history
New Britain was a primarily agricultural community and part of Berlin and Farmington until its separate incorporation in 1850.  Its industrial history began with small metalworking shops that grew in size and scope, until it was one of the leading centers of tool manufacture in the country.  The Walnut Hill neighborhood is sandwiched between the city's downtown and Walnut Hill Park, which was originally built out as a water supply reservoir, but was converted into a public park in the 1860s.  The area now contains an architecturally diverse collection of housing, built between about 1840 and 1930.  Most of the houses are of wood frame construction, and are generally of similar size and scale, set on similarly sized lots with uniform setbacks, giving the area a cohesive feel despite its architectural diversity.

The district boundaries are generally drawn to exclude commercial development along its northern and eastern boundaries (West Main, Main, and Arch Streets), as well as larger apartment blocks.  On Arch Street, the Lutheran Church and state armory building are included.  On the southern boundary, frame residences on both sides of Hart Street are included.  There are a total of 145 principal structures that are of historic significance.  The single most-represented architectural style is the Italianate, reflective of the city's growth in the 1850s and 1860s.  One particularly fine example of this style is the David Nelson Camp House at 9 Camp Street.  Institutional exceptions to the area's residential character include buildings of the 1881 state normal school on Hillside Place.

See also

National Register of Historic Places listings in Hartford County, Connecticut

References

Historic districts on the National Register of Historic Places in Connecticut
National Register of Historic Places in Hartford County, Connecticut
Gothic Revival architecture in Connecticut
Italianate architecture in Connecticut
Queen Anne architecture in Connecticut
Buildings and structures completed in 1840
Historic districts in Hartford County, Connecticut
New Britain, Connecticut
Historic districts in Connecticut